The Chi Omega Chapter House is a building built in 1927 on the campus of the University of Arkansas in Fayetteville, Arkansas.  The building was listed on the National Register of Historic Places in 1995.

History

The University of Arkansas became Arkansas' land-grant university in 1871 when Old Main was constructed atop McIlroy Hill. Kappa Sigma was founded as the first fraternity at the university in 1890, and in 1895 the Chi Omega fraternity for women (today called sorority) was created. The group bought Lot 12, Block 3 in the Oakland Place Addition in 1928, becoming the first Greek house to own campus property.

University building superintendent Charles L. Ellis was contacted to draw up plans for the house, and construction began in 1928. The contract was awarded to the Wages Brothers who worked with architect/Fayetteville building inspector James Dinwiddie.

Architecture

The building has distinct Colonial Revival architecture details such as the large front porch, dentil course along the cornice line, and a pediment over the front entrance. The chapter house also includes a suspended roof supported by four Roman doric columns.

Additions
Chi Omega has expanded onto the chapter house twice, first in 1941 and again in 1958. The first addition made it possible to house 75 members and a housemother. The 1958 construction consisted of an expanded kitchen and dining room, more bathrooms, more closets, and more bedrooms. Amenities added in 1958 were a sun porch, porte-cochère, study room, office, recreation room, and a men's room.

See also
 Chi Omega
 Chi Omega Greek Theater, replica Greek architecture theater donated by Chi Omega in 1930
 University of Arkansas Campus Historic District
 National Register of Historic Places listings in Washington County, Arkansas

Notes

References

School buildings on the National Register of Historic Places in Arkansas
Neoclassical architecture in Arkansas
Residential buildings completed in 1927
University of Arkansas buildings
National Register of Historic Places in Fayetteville, Arkansas
Fraternity and sorority houses
University and college buildings completed in 1927
1927 establishments in Arkansas